Terpsion (gen.: Τερψίωνος; fl. 5th–4th century BCE) of Megara, was one of the disciples of Socrates. According to Plato, he was present at the death of Socrates.  He appears in the prologue of Plato's Theaetetus as a friend of Euclid of Megara. Plutarch also refers to him.

Athenaeus mentions a Terpsion as the first author of a Gastronomy, giving advice as to the food from which it was advisable to abstain. A proverb of his is recorded: "eat now a tortoise's flesh or leave it alone", of which Athenaeus preserves more than one reading.

See also
List of speakers in Plato's dialogues

References

4th-century BC Greek people
Ancient Megarians
Pupils of Socrates